is a Japanese Buddhist new religious movement  in the tradition of the Daigo branch of Shingon Buddhism.

In 2011, Shinnyo-en was reported to have 860,000 members, and temples and training centers in several countries in Asia, Europe and the Americas. The temples are characterised by the Nirvana image, a statue of the reclining Buddha.

Central to Shinnyo-en is the belief, expressed in the Mahāyāna Mahāparinirvāṇa Sūtra, that all beings possess Buddha-nature, a natural, unfettered purity that can respond creatively and compassionately to any situation in life.

 the head of Shinnyo-en was Shinsō Itō (born 1942, also known as 'Keishu'), who holds the rank of Daisōjō, the highest rank in traditional Shingon Buddhism.

History
Shinnyo-en was established in 1936 by Shinjō Itō and his wife Tomoji in the Tokyo suburb of Tachikawa. In December 1935, Shinjō Itō and Tomoji Itō had enshrined an image of Acala believed to have been sculpted by the renowned Buddhist sculptor Unkei and they began a 30-day period of winter austerities in early 1936. Tomoji cultivated her  on February 4, inheriting it from her aunt.

In May 1936, Shinjō Itō was ordained by Daisōjō and Chief Abbot Egen Saeki at Sanbō-in, a temple of the Daigo school of Shingon Buddhism. The Chief Abbot conferred to him the monastic name of Shinjō, meaning "True Vehicle", and the title of Kongō-in, which means "Vajra", in December 1938. Accordingly, he changed his name from Fumiaki Itō to Shinjō Itō in April 1942.

The community was first named Risshō-kaku, then the Tachikawa Fellowship of Achala (Tachikawa Fudoson Kyokai, 1938-1948). Formally registered in 1948 under the Religious Corporations Ordinance (enacted in 1945) the name changed to Sangha of Truth (Makoto-Kyodan) with Shinchō-ji as its Head Temple.

In spring of 1949, a young man who worked in the temple office, filed formal charges against Shinjō in 1950. His primary claim was that he had been beaten during one of the sesshin trainings. Shuten Oishi, director of the Federation of New Religious Organisations of Japan, testified that sesshin training does not involve physical abuse. Shinjō was given a sentence of eight months in prison, suspended for three years.

The sangha was permitted to continue, but under a different name. It was reorganized and renamed Shinnyo-en on June 21, 1951 and Tomoji Itō became its administrative head. After the revision of the Japanese Religious Corporation Act in April 1951, Shinnyo-en filed an application in the following year and received approval from the Minister of Education on May 16, 1953.

The first image of the reclining Nirvana Buddha, sculpted by Shinjō Itō, was consecrated on November 3, 1957.

Wat Paknam Bhasicharoen, a Thai Buddhist temple, presented Shinnyo-en with śarīra (sacred relics of Lord Buddha) on July 30, 1966.

The first Shinnyo-en Sanctuary outside Japan was inaugurated on March 2, 1971 in Mililani, Hawaii, followed by the dedication of temples in Honolulu (1973), San Francisco (1982), Taiwan (1985), France (1985), Los Angeles (1990), Italy (1990), Belgium (1991), Hong Kong (1992), U.K. (1994), Germany (1994), Singapore (1994), and Australia (1999).

Teachings
The principal sutras on which the Shinnyo teachings are based are the Prajñāpāramitā Sutra, the Lotus Sutra and the Mahāyāna Mahāparinirvāṇa Sūtra. According to Shinnyo-en, the Mahāparinirvāṇa Sutra teaches four key points:
 Buddhahood is always present
 All beings possess a Buddha-nature
 There is hope for everyone to attain nirvana
 Nirvana is of the present moment and characterized by permanence-bliss-self-purity.

Junna Nakata, the 103rd Head Priest of Daigoji Monastery of the Shingon School, describes the teaching as follows:

Schrimpf commented on the introduction of the Mahaparinirvana sutra to Shinnyo-en members in 1956,

The teachings also integrate elements of traditional Theravada, Mahayana and Vajrayana Buddhism, cultural influences characteristic to Japanese Buddhism, as well as practices and rituals initiated by Shinjo Ito, the founder of Shinnyo-en.

As all religious organizations founded since the middle of the 19th century Shinnyo-en is classified by Japanese scholars as a new religious movement.

Organizational structure
According to Schrimpf, "the community is divided into various units that form a hierarchical pyramid."
The basic organizational unit of the Shinnyo-en sangha is said to be the “lineage”, which consists of a group of members mentored by a “lineage parent”. Practitioners usually gather at the temple and training centre for prayer, meditation and training, and, if they so wish, also at home meetings. The sangha as a whole encourages and participates in volunteer activities in the spirit of Buddhist practice.

The leadership in Shinnyo-en follows the Buddhist tradition of Dharma succession from master to disciple:

In 1982 Shinsō Itō (born 1942 as Masako Itō), the third daughter of Shinjō and Tomoji, completed her Buddhist training. Shinjō announced her to become his successor in 1983 and gave her the priestly name 'Shinsō'. After Shinjō's passing on July 19, 1989 Shinsō Itō becomes the head of Shinnyo-en. In 1992, Shinsō Itō was conferred Daisōjo, the highest priestly rank in traditional Shingon Buddhism, by the Daigo-ji Shingon Buddhist monastery. She also received an honorary doctorate from Mahachulalongkornrajavidyalaya University in Thailand in 2002 for her long-standing efforts to foster relations with Theravada Buddhism.

In Shinnyo-en's Dharma School members study Buddhist doctrine and learn ritualistic aspects. After graduating as a Dharma Teacher they can further qualify for undergoing Buddhist ordination and receiving traditional monastic ranks.

Social action
Shinnyo-en believes an individual's action can contribute to creating a harmonious society. Working towards this goal, the organization engages in interfaith dialogue, environmental activities, and disaster relief. Shinnyo-en also supports organizations such as Médecins sans Frontières (Doctors Without Borders), the Red Cross Society, and the World Wildlife Fund.

In an interview conducted by the Tricycle magazine, Shinso Ito stated:

Shinnyo practice

Three Practices 
 are:
 
 
 .
Concretely, this means  abiding by the principles of the Teachings, participating in volunteer activities, and donating small sums of money.

Sesshin
Sesshin (the word is composed of the two Chinese characters, “touch” and “heart”) is the central element of spiritual practice for Shinnyo practitioners. This is not to be confused with the sesshin in Zen Buddhism. Whereas in Zen Buddhism, sesshin refers to a period of intensive meditation, with many hours of meditation each day, sesshin in Shinnyo-en has an entirely different meaning.

This kind of guidance lasts for about three minutes per person, and is, in most cases, given only at a Shinnyo-en temple, aimed to help members to understand themselves in light of Buddhist concepts.

Shinnyo-en refers to the spiritual world from which the guiding messages emanate as the shinnyo reikai. The spiritual guides' contact with this world is not direct, but aided by the intercession of two  and various dharma protectors, who are viewed as being one with forces of the heavens and earth. The Two Dōjis are none other than the first and second sons of Ito Shinjo, posthumously named, respectively, Kyodoin (died aged one year old) and Shindoin (died aged fifteen). Guidance from the Buddha realm is passed to the spiritual guides and subsequently to the practitioners.

Schrimpf describes the practice of sesshin as follows:

Dharma School
Practitioners have the opportunity to further their practice by studying at Shinnyo-en's dharma school. After three years of classes and fulfilling various requirements, including passing a written test and assessment of everyday practice, they are granted priestly ranks (僧階 sokai) and become dharma teachers.

Fire and Water Ceremonies
According to the Shinnyo-en website they practice water and fire ceremonies. "While most traditional Buddhist fire rituals focus on personal purification and awakening, the Shinnyo-en ceremony is dedicated to awakening people to their innate compassionate and altruistic nature, transcending all boundaries of age, gender, nationality, ethnicity, and religious tradition, and directing the positive energy of the ceremony outward with the hope that all people can live in a world of hope and harmony."

Other Practices
Through mindfulness and seated meditation, practitioners reflect on themselves and resolve to practice harmony, gratitude, kindness, and acceptance. The school teaches that one realizes his or her true potential by acting with compassion and concern for others. Therefore, practitioners are encouraged to cultivate mindfulness and self-reflection, and to apply in daily life the insights gained in seated meditation.

Shinnyo-en practitioners in pursuing the Path to Nirvana vow to abide by the Five Precepts (Pali: pañca-sīlāni) and follow the Eightfold Path, although no reference can be found of Shinnyo-en teaching Right Mindfulness, nor Right Concentration, these being the last two steps on the Eightfold Path and those which contain traditional Buddhist meditation practice.

By learning to identify with others (or "place oneself in the shoes of another"), practitioners aim to cultivate the virtues of a bodhisattva.

Missionary activities
In Shinnyo-en a school for the training of missionaries has been developed, and lectures are given on the Shinnyo-en doctrine, history, and missionary methods. Students take three years to complete the prescribed course of study. The system of missionary ranks is called sokai or “stages in Buddhist discipleship.”

Shinnyo Buddhist ceremonies
Traditional ceremonies, derived from Shingon Buddhism — many of which can be traced back to ancient Vedic and Hindu ceremonies — are an important aspect of Shinnyo Buddhist practice. Rituals are used as means to purify the mind, awaken compassion, or to express gratitude for the chance to develop oneself and practice the Buddhist teachings.

Prayers for ancestors and departed souls, such as the Lantern Floating ceremony, and O-bon (Sanskrit: Ullambana), are believed to also help cultivate kindness and compassion within practitioners.

With the wish of creating cultural harmony and understanding, Her Holiness Shinso Ito, Head Priest of Shinnyo-en, officiated the inaugural Lantern Floating Hawaii ceremony on Memorial Day, 1999.

Traditional fire ceremonies such as homa are performed to help practitioners overcome obstacles that hinder their spiritual progress and liberation.

See also
 Buddhism in Japan
 List of new religious movements
 New religious movement 
 Ullambana Sutra

References

Sources

Further reading

External links
Shinnyo-En (official website in English)
Saisho Goma/Homa Ceremony -Berlin
Lantern Floating Ceremony – Hawaii
Smile Foundation Newsletter India
UC Berkeley Press Release
RNS Buddhist Leader Her Holiness Shinso Ito Breaks New Ground in Thailand
Huffington Post, "Shinnyo-en Buddhist 'Eye Opening' Ceremony In Japan"

 
Buddhist new religious movements
Japanese new religions
Religious organizations based in Japan
Shingon Buddhism